Protorthodes is a genus of moths of the family Noctuidae.

Species
 Protorthodes alfkenii (Grote, 1895)
 Protorthodes antennata (Barnes & McDunnough, 1912)
 Protorthodes argentoppida McDunnough, 1943
 Protorthodes curtica (Smith, 1890)
 Protorthodes eureka (Barnes & Benjamin, 1927)
 Protorthodes incincta (Morrison, 1875)
 Protorthodes melanopis (Hampson, 1905)
 Protorthodes mexicana Lafontaine, 2014
 Protorthodes mulina (Schaus, 1894)
 Protorthodes orobia (Harvey, 1876)
 Protorthodes oviduca (Guenée, 1852)
 Protorthodes perforata (Grote, 1883)
 Protorthodes rufula (Grote, 1874)
 Protorthodes texicana Lafontaine, 2014
 Protorthodes ustulata Lafontaine, Walsh & Ferris, 2014

Former species
 Protorthodes constans (Dyar, 1918)
 Protorthodes texana (Smith, 1900)
 Protorthodes variabilis (Barnes & McDunnough, 1912)

References
 Natural History Museum Lepidoptera genus database
 Protorthodes at funet.fi

Hadeninae